Just Gimme Somethin' I'm Used To is an album of American musicians Norman Blake and Nancy Blake, released in 1992. It was nominated for a Grammy Award for Best Traditional Folk Album.

Track listing 
 "Waiting for the Boatman" – 4:16
 "Georgia Railroad" – 3:26
 "Silence or Tears" – 3:20
 "The Poor Little Sailor Boy" – 6:17
 "Medley: Green Leaf Fancy/The Fields of November/Gonna Go Huntin' " – 7:24
 "When the Work's All Done This Fall" (Traditional) – 4:01
 "Brickyard Joe" – 3:20
 "Mr. Garfield" (Ramblin' Jack Elliott) – 7:22
 "Old Grimes" – 2:27
 "Wabash Cannonball" (A. P. Carter) – 5:02
 "I'd Rather Be an Old Time Christian" – 3:20
 "Little Matty Groves" – 7:03
 "Walking Tune" – 5:15

Personnel
Norman Blake – guitar, fiddle, vocals
Nancy Blake – guitar, cello, vocals

References

1992 albums
Norman Blake (American musician) albums